Crutin is an Italian cheese prepared using cow's milk and black truffle shavings that is prepared in Langhe, Piedmont. It is a crumbly cheese with a pale yellow coloration, and has a slight citrus flavor and aroma as well as the flavor of truffles. The aroma of cellars where it is aged can also be inherent in the cheese. It is typically aged for one to two months.

Crutin is named after "a small cellar excavated from stone", which was used by Langhe farmers for winter storage purposes.

See also

 List of Italian cheeses

References

External links
 Delectable Crutin Cheese. Italy Chronicles.

Piedmontese cheeses